The 2000 Marshall Thundering Herd football team represented Marshall University in 2000 NCAA Division I-A football season. The Thundering Herd played their home games at Marshall University Stadium in Huntington, West Virginia, and competed in the East Division of the Mid-American Conference (MAC). The team was coached by fifth-year head coach Bob Pruett. Marshall won its fourth consecutive MAC championship.

Schedule

Roster

Team players in the NFL

References

Marshall
Marshall Thundering Herd football seasons
Little Caesars Pizza Bowl champion seasons
Mid-American Conference football champion seasons
Marshall Thundering Herd football